The 2016 Norwegian Figure Skating Championships was held at the Bergenshallen in Bergen from 5 to 7 February 2016. The skaters participating must have reached a minimum technical element score (TES) set by the Norwegian Skating Association at one of the national qualification events during the 2015–16 season.

Senior medalists

Men

Ladies

Junior Medalists

Ladies

References

External links
 2016 Norwegian Championships results
 Official website

Norwegian Figure Skating Championships
Norwegian Figure Skating Championships, 2016
2016 in Norwegian sport